Il tredicesimo apostolo (The Thirteenth Apostle) is an Italian television series produced in 2012. Directed by Alexis Sweet.

Characters
Claudia Pandolfi as Doctor Claudia Munari (season 1-)
Claudio Gioè as Father Gabriel Antinori (season 1-)
Luigi Diberti as Monsignor Demetrio Antinori (season 1-)
Yorgo Voyagis as Father Alonso (season 1-)
Stefano Pesce as Isaia Morganti (season 1-)
Tommaso Ragno as Bonifacio Serventi (season 1-)

Episodes

Season 1 - Il prescelto (2012)

Season 2 - La rivelazione (2014)

See also
List of Italian television series

External links
 

2012 Italian television series debuts
Italian fantasy television series
Canale 5 original programming